Dedrick Dwayne Gobert (November 25, 1971 – November 19, 1994) was an American film actor best known for his supporting role as Dooky in the 1991 film Boyz n the Hood.

Career
Gobert made his film debut in the 1991 John Singleton film Boyz n the Hood. In the film, he portrayed the role of "Dooky", a friend of Darrin "Doughboy" Baker (Ice Cube). Gobert's character was noted for his ever-present pacifier. The character's pacifier has been cited as the origin of the pacifier trend that was popular among teenagers and young adults in the early 1990s (Flavor Flav, who wore one around his neck in a Public Enemy video, has also been cited as the originator).

He followed with supporting roles in two other Singleton-directed films: Poetic Justice (1993) and Higher Learning (1995), which were released after his death.

Death and aftermath
On November 19, 1994, Gobert was fatally shot during a fight with several gang members in Mira Loma, California. The shooting occurred shortly after Gobert attended an illegal drag race in Mira Loma. He was 22 years old.  Gobert's friend, 19-year-old Ignacio Hernandez, who was a participant in the race, was also fatally shot when he attempted to shield Gobert during the fight. Gobert's girlfriend Jenny Hyon was shot in the right side of the neck but survived.  The bullet was later removed but damaged her spinal cord and left her paralyzed from the neck down.

On December 12, 1994, police arrested 22-year-old Sonny Enraca based on information they received from a witness at the shooting scene. Enraca, a Philippine national who had lived in the United States for eight years, was a member of the Akrho Boyz Crazzy (ABC) gang, an affiliate of the Bloods. Enraca initially denied involvement in the shootings but confessed soon after being arrested.  On May 5, 1999, a jury found Sonny Enraca guilty of two counts of first-degree murder with a multiple-murder special circumstance finding and assault with a deadly weapon with intent to cause great bodily injury. On May 12, Enraca was sentenced to death.

Gov. Gavin Newsom signed a sweeping order in March 2019 putting an executive moratorium on California's death penalty, thus ordering a reprieve for the 737 people on death row. Sonny Enraca is one of the inmates.

Filmography

References

External links

1971 births
1994 deaths
1994 murders in the United States
20th-century American male actors
African-American male actors
American male film actors
Deaths by firearm in California
Male actors from Louisiana
Murdered African-American people
People murdered in California
Burials at Holy Cross Cemetery, Culver City
20th-century African-American people